The loggerhead kingbird (Tyrannus caudifasciatus) is a species of bird in the family Tyrannidae.

Distribution and habitat
It is found in throughout the West Indies, in the Bahamas, Cayman Islands, Cuba, Hispaniola (the Dominican Republic and Haiti), Jamaica, Puerto Rico, and, very rarely, in southern Florida. Its natural habitats are subtropical or tropical moist lowland forest and subtropical or tropical moist montane forest.

Description
It is dark grey above and white below. The head is black while the throat and cheeks are white. Like many kingbird species, the loggerhead possesses an orange or yellow crown patch, but it is well concealed and rarely visible in the field. The tail is squared and ends with a buffy-white band.

Diet
It feeds on flying insects, small fruit and berries, and small lizards.

Gallery

References

External links

 
 
 
 
 
 
 

loggerhead kingbird
Birds of the Caribbean
Birds of Hispaniola
Birds of the Dominican Republic
Birds of Haiti
Birds of the Bahamas
Birds of the Cayman Islands
Birds of the Greater Antilles
loggerhead kingbird
Taxonomy articles created by Polbot